Adam Sapieha may refer to:

 Adam Stefan Sapieha (1867–1951), Polish cardinal of the Roman Catholic Church
 Adam Stanisław Sapieha (1828–1903), Polish nobleman, landlord, politician
 Adam Zygmunt Sapieha (1892–1970), military aviator and cavalry officer in the Polish Army